A frenum piercing is a type of body piercing located on the underside of the shaft of the penis. A series of parallel frenum piercings is known as a frenum ladder. A frenum ladder may be extended to include lorum piercings, hafada piercings and guiche piercings.

Placement
It is almost always pierced through the frenum that connects the head of the penis to the shaft.

Healing

Frenum piercings generally require from two to five weeks to heal fully. Depending on the placement it may be a surface piercing, but due to both the vascular, fast healing nature of the penis, and loose nature of the skin in that area, frenum piercings rarely reject if pierced properly, although they may migrate.

Those wishing to stretch this piercing to accommodate larger gauge jewelry should wait until at least two weeks after the initial piercing has fully healed.  It is common for a frenum piercing to start to close soon after the jewelry has been removed.  A fairly recent piercing may start to close in less than an hour.  Temporary removal and replacement (for example, to accommodate a partner who finds it uncomfortable) may mean reinserting with a smaller gauge and then restretching to get back to the original, larger gauge.  This tendency for the piercing to close up will diminish over time.

Jewelry
Both barbells and rings can be worn in frenum piercings, both as initial jewellery and on an ongoing basis.  Sometimes, when rings are worn, the diameter of the ring is specifically chosen so that the ring can be worn encircling the penis.  A wide variety of chastity devices make use of frenum piercings to secure themselves to the penis, as part of fetish or BDSM activities.

History and culture
The earliest literary reference to frenum piercings occurs in 1884 in Zeitschrift für Ethnologie which states: "Amongst the Timorese of Indonesia, the Frenulum beneath the glans penis is pierced with brass rings...the function of the ring is to enhance stimulation during sex."  Anecdotal piercing lore associates this piercing (along with many other male genital piercings) with various chastity devices that have been used throughout history, although there is little hard data to back up this claim.

In contemporary society, frenum piercings were primarily found amongst the members of gay BDSM subcultures, until body piercing became re-introduced to mainstream society in the late 1970s and early 1980s.

Frenum piercings are often intended to provide sexual pleasure to both the bearer and the person they are having sexual intercourse with.  They may also be used to attach chastity devices to the bearer, denying them sexual pleasure.

Frenum ladder

A Frenum Ladder, also known as a Jacob's Ladder, consists of a series of frenum piercings often extending from below the head of the penis and as far as the base of the shaft of the penis.

Sometimes, a frenum ladder will be accompanied by a hafada ladder and/or a guiche ladder.  Due to the relatively easy healing of these piercings it is not uncommon for several, or even all of them to be performed at the same time.

Less common is a lorum ladder which consists of a series of lorum piercings.

See also
 Body piercing
 Genital modification

References

Penis piercings